Nicolae Orlovschi (born 1 April 1985 in Bălți, Moldavian SSR) is a Moldavian football defender who plays for FC Dacia Chișinău.

Club statistics
Total matches played in Moldavian First League: 80 matches - 8 goals

References

External links

Profile at Divizia Nationala
Profile at FC Dacia Chișinău

1985 births
Sportspeople from Bălți
Moldovan footballers
Living people
Association football defenders
Moldova youth international footballers
Moldova international footballers